The Knave of Hearts is a 1919 British silent romance film directed by Floyd Martin Thornton and starring James Knight, Evelyn Boucher and Harry Agar Lyons.

Cast
 James Knight as Lord Hillsdown
 Evelyn Boucher as Peggy Malvern
 Harry Agar Lyons as Earl of Brinmore
 J. Edwards Barker as Oliver Slade
 Arthur J. Mayne as Sir Guy
 Adeline Hayden Coffin
 Lottie Blackford
 Nessie Blackford

References

Bibliography
 Low, Rachael. History of the British Film, 1918-1929. George Allen & Unwin, 1971.

External links

1919 films
1910s romance films
British romance films
British silent feature films
1910s English-language films
Films directed by Floyd Martin Thornton
British black-and-white films
1910s British films